In the state of Kansas, the common law felony murder rule has been codified in K.S.A. 21-3401. The statute defines first degree murder as, among other things, homicide in the commission of, attempt to commit, or escape from an inherently dangerous felony. Inherently dangerous felonies are defined in K.S.A. 21-3436 and include armed robbery, arson, and aggravated burglary. A felony murder conviction in Kansas carries a mandatory life sentence without the possibility of parole for 25 years.

Judicial interpretations
In the case State v. Hoang, 243 Kan. 40 (1988), the Supreme Court of Kansas held that the accidental death of a co-felon during the commission of arson could support a felony murder conviction.

In the case State v. Sophophone, 270 Kan. 703 (2001), the Supreme Court of Kansas held that a felony murder conviction could not be supported if the co-felon was killed by lawful attempts at apprehension by a police officer.

References

Murder in Kansas
U.S. state criminal law
Kansas law